Lecanora stenotropa is a species of lichen in the family Lecanoraceae. It was described as new to science in 1872 by Finnish botanist William Nylander.

See also
List of Lecanora species

References

Lichens described in 1872
Lichen species
Lichens of Europe
stenotropa
Taxa named by William Nylander (botanist)